The variegated tree frog (Megastomatohyla mixomaculata) is a species of frog in the family Hylidae endemic to Mexico. Its natural habitats are subtropical or tropical moist montane forests and intermittent rivers. It is threatened by habitat loss.  Humans are destroying their habitats because of the population increase.

References

Megastomatohyla
Amphibians described in 1950
Taxonomy articles created by Polbot